Streptomyces griseosporeus is a bacterium species from the genus of Streptomyces. Streptomyces griseosporeus produces taitomycin, 2-amino-4-hydroxypentanonic acid and liposidomycins.

See also 
 List of Streptomyces species

References

Further reading

External links
Type strain of Streptomyces griseosporeus at BacDive – the Bacterial Diversity Metadatabase

griseosporeus
Bacteria described in 1960